Ken Heineman (January 13, 1918 – July 10, 2012) was an American football defensive back. He played for the Cleveland Rams in 1940 and for the Brooklyn Dodgers in 1943.

He died on July 10, 2012, in Rogers, Arkansas at age 94.

References

1918 births
2012 deaths
American football defensive backs
UTEP Miners football players
Cleveland Rams players
Brooklyn Dodgers (NFL) players